Crystal Days: 1979–1999 is a four CD box set by Echo & the Bunnymen which was released in July 2001. It is a retrospective compilation of the band's work between 1979 and 1999. The first three cds include most of their singles, several album tracks, some alternate mixes, unreleased songs and B-sides published on 7-inch and 12-inch vinyls, plus versions recorded for John Peel sessions on BBC Radio 1. The fourth CD is a live cd with cover versions.

Most of the extra material, consisting of B-sides and alternate mixes, would be later included as bonus tracks on the albums CD reissues of 2003 and 2008. 

This retrospective boxset omits the material released when the band was fronted by Noel Burke (1990–92).

Track listing 
All tracks written by Ian McCulloch, Will Sergeant, Les Pattinson and Pete de Freitas except where noted.

Disc one 
 "Monkeys" (McCulloch, Sergeant, Pattinson) (original version) – 3.04
 "The Pictures on My Wall" (McCulloch, Sergeant, Pattinson) (original single version) – 2.51
 "Read It in Books" (Julian Cope, McCulloch) (original single version) – 2.59
 "Villiers Terrace" (John Peel session 15 August 1979) – 4.13
 "Rescue" – 4.26
 "Simple Stuff" – 2.35
 "Stars Are Stars" – 2.47
 "All That Jazz" – 2.47
 "Crocodiles" – 2.40
 "The Puppet" – 3.07
 "Do It Clean" – 2.48
 "Show of Strength" −4.56
 "Over the Wall" – 6.06
 "A Promise" – 4.04
 "Heaven Up Here" −3.43
 "All My Colours" – 4.02
 "Broke My Neck" (long version) – 7.17
 "No Hands" (John Peel session 27 January 1982) – 3.11
 "Fuel" – 4.05
 "The Subject" – 5.09

Disc two 
 "The Back of Love" – 3.15
 "The Cutter" – 3.52
 "Way Out and Up We Go" – 4.03
 "Clay" – 4.16
 "Heads Will Roll" – 3.33
 "Gods Will Be Gods" (alternate version) – 5.30
 "Never Stop (Discotheque)" – 4.46
 "Watch Out Below" (John Peel session 19 September 1983) – 2.50
 "The Killing Moon" (All Night version) – 9.13
 "Silver (Tidal Wave)" – 5.12
 "Angels and Devils" – 4.23
 "Crystal Days" – 2.26
 "Seven Seas" – 3.20
 "My Kingdom" – 4.06
 "Ocean Rain" – 5.18
 "All You Need Is Love" (Lennon–McCartney) – 6.42

Disc three 
 "Bring on the Dancing Horses" – 4.05
 "Over Your Shoulder" – 4.07
 "Lover, I Love You" (McCulloch, Sergeant, Pattinson) – 4.20
 "Satisfaction" (McCulloch, Sergeant, Pattinson) – 4.11
 "New Direction" (original version) (McCulloch, Sergeant, Pattinson) – 4.23
 "Ship of Fools" (McCulloch, Sergeant, Pattinson) – 4.04
 "All My Life" (McCulloch, Sergeant, Pattinson) – 4.10
 "The Game" (McCulloch, Sergeant, Pattinson) – 3.51
 "Bedbugs and Ballyhoo" – 3.29
 "Lips Like Sugar" (single mix) (McCulloch, Sergeant, Pattinson) – 4.37
 "People Are Strange" (full-length version) (Robbie Krieger, Jim Morrison) – 4.32
 "Rollercoaster" – 4.05
 "Don't Let It Get You Down" (McCulloch, Sergeant, Pattinson) – 3.52
 "I Want to Be There (When You Come)" (McCulloch, Sergeant, Pattinson) – 3.39
 "Nothing Lasts Forever" (McCulloch, Sergeant, Pattinson) – 3.56
 "Hurracaine" (McCulloch, Sergeant, Pattinson) – 4.21
 "Rust" (McCulloch, Sergeant, Pattinson) – 5.24
 "What Are You Going To Do With Your Life?" (McCulloch, Sergeant, Pattinson) – 5.11

Disc four 
 "In the Midnight Hour" (Steve Cropper, Wilson Pickett) – 3.30
 "Start Again" (live 6 November 1987) (McCulloch) – 3.26
 "The Original Cutter – A Drop in the Ocean" – 4.00
 "Heads Will Roll" (Summer version) – 4.25
 "Bedbugs and Ballyhoo" (original single version) – 3.38
 "Zimbo" (live 17 July 1982 with The Royal Burundi Drummers) – 4.57
 "Angels and Devils" (live 25 April 1985) – 3.04
 "She Cracked" (live 4/85) (Jonathan Richman) – 2.54
 "It's All Over Now, Baby Blue" (live 4/85) (Bob Dylan) – 3.33
 "Soul Kitchen" (live 25 April 1985) (John Densmore, Krieger, Ray Manzarek, Morrison) – 3.50
 "Action Woman" (live 25 April 1985) (Warren Kendrick) – 3.21
 "Paint It, Black" (live 25 April 1985) (Jagger/Richards) – 3.15
 "Run Run Run" (live 25 April 1985) (Lou Reed) – 3.59
 "Friction" (live 25 April 1985) (Tom Verlaine) – 4.44
 "Crocodiles" (live 25 April 1985) – 6.06
 "Heroin" (live 18 July 1983) (Reed) – 5.43
 "Do It Clean" (live 18 July 1983) – 8.18
 "The Cutter" (alternate version) – 4.06

Personnel

Musicians

Echo & the Bunnymen 
 Ian McCulloch – guitar, vocals
 Will Sergeant – guitar, harpsichord, sitar
 Les Pattinson – bass guitar
 Pete de Freitas – drums

Other musicians 

 David Balfe – piano, keyboards
 Jake Brockman – keyboards
 Julian Cope – keyboards
 Liam Gallagher – backing vocals
 Michael K. Lee – drums
 London Metropolitan Orchestra – strings, brass, woodwind
 Ray Manzarek – keyboards
 Mike Mooney – guitar
 Harry Morgan – percussion
 Stephen Morris – drums
 David Palmer – drums

 Leslie Penny – woodwind
 Alan Perman – harpsichord
 Adam Peters – piano, cello, conductor, keyboards
 Guy Pratt – bass guitar
 Henry Priestman – keyboards
 Shankar – strings
 Ed Shearmur – piano
 Jeremy Stacey – drums
 Mark Taylor – keyboards
 Tim Whittaker – percussion
 Paul "Tubbs" Williams – backing vocals

Production 

 Lars Aldman – original recording producer
 Shawn Amos – liner note co-ordination
 Vanessa Atkins – project assistant
 David Balfe – engineer, original recording producer
 Stuart Barry – engineer
 David Bascombe – engineer
 Michael Bergek – engineer
 John Brierly – engineer
 Hugh Brown – art direction
 Emily Cagan – project assistant
 Peter Coleman – engineer
 Pete de Freitas – engineer
 Bill Drummond – original recording producer
 Echo & the Bunnymen – engineer, mixing, original recording producer
 Colin Fairley – engineer
 David Frazer – engineer
 Daniel Goldmark – editorial research
 Paul Gomersall – engineer
 Nick Gomm – engineer
 Rachel Gutek – art direction
 Alex Haas – mixing
 Dan Hersch – remastering
 Kevin Howlett – original recording producer
 Bill Inglot – mixing, remastering, audio production
 Nick Ingman – string arrangements
 Hugh Jones – engineer, original recording producer
 Brian Kehew – mixing
 Bruce Lampcov – mixing
 Laurie Latham – original recording producer

 Henri Loustau – engineer
 David Lord – engineer
 Ray Manzarek – original recording producer
 Guy Massey – engineer
 David McLees – project assistant
 Patrick Milligan – project supervisor
 Martin Mitchell – engineer
 Jo Motta – project assistant
 Chris Nagle – engineer
 Clif Norrell – mixing
 Gil Norton – engineer, mixing, original recording producer
 Alan Perman – original recording producer
 Randy Perry – project assistant
 Adam Peters – string arrangements, orchestral arrangements
 Gary Peterson – discographical annotation
 Steve Riddle – engineer
 Don Rodenbach – mixing
 Alex Scannell – assistant engineer
 Steve Short – engineer
 Mark "Spike" Stent – mixing
 Julee Stover – editorial supervision
 Cenzo Townshend – engineer
 Amy Utstein – project assistant
 Chris Walter – photography
 Richard Woodcraft – mixing
 Dave Woolley – engineer
 Andrea Wright – assistant engineer
 Andy Zax – compilation producer

References 

 [ Allmusic]
 Villiers Terrace.com The Ultimate Echo and the Bunnymen discography

Albums produced by Laurie Latham
Echo & the Bunnymen compilation albums
2001 compilation albums
Rhino Records compilation albums